"Love Is Alright Tonite" is a song performed by Australian musician Rick Springfield. The song was released as a single in 1981 from the album, Working Class Dog. In February 1982, it reached No. 20 on the U.S. Billboard Hot 100.

Billboard called it a "craftily constructed uptempo pop song filled with melodic hooks and an identifiable lyric line."  Record World praised the "throbbing beat, slashing guitars and Rick's vocal determination."

Chart history

Song usage in other media 

The song appears in the 2001 film, Wet Hot American Summer.

References 

Rick Springfield songs
1981 singles
1981 songs
Songs written by Rick Springfield